Phedimus stellatus is a species of plant in the family Crassulaceae.

References 

Flora of Malta